Fissurella nodosa, commonly known as the knobbed keyhole limpet, is a species of sea snail, a marine gastropod mollusk in the family Fissurellidae, the keyhole limpets.

Description
The size of an adult shell varies between 20 mm and 44 mm.

Distribution
F. nodosa is endemic to the Florida Keys, the Gulf of Mexico, the Caribbean Sea and the West Indies.

References

 Turgeon, D.D., et al. 1998. Common and scientific names of aquatic invertebrates of the United States and Canada. American Fisheries Society Special Publication 26 page(s): 58
 Rosenberg, G., F. Moretzsohn, and E. F. García. 2009. Gastropoda (Mollusca) of the Gulf of Mexico, Pp. 579–699 in Felder, D.L. and D.K. Camp (eds.), Gulf of Mexico–Origins, Waters, and Biota. Biodiversity. Texas A&M Press, College Station, Texas.

External links
  McLean J.H. (1984) Systematics of Fissurella in the Peruvian and Magellanic faunal provinces (Gastropoda: Prosobranchia). Contributions in Science, Natural History Museum of Los Angeles County 354: 1–70. (29 October 1984 
 

Fissurellidae
Gastropods described in 1778
Taxa named by Ignaz von Born